The 2012 ATP China International Tennis Challenge – Anning was a professional tennis tournament played on clay courts. It was the first edition of the tournament which was part of the 2012 ATP Challenger Tour. It took place in Anning, China between 16 and 22 July 2012.

Singles main draw entrants

Seeds

 1 Rankings are as of July 9, 2012.

Other entrants
The following players received wildcards into the singles main draw:
  Ouyang Bowen
  Wang Chuhan
  W Gao
  Gao Xin

The following players received entry from the qualifying draw:
  Matthew Barton
  Lee Hsin-han
  Arata Onozawa
  Yi Chu-huan

Champions

Singles

 Grega Žemlja def.  Aljaž Bedene, 1–6, 7–5, 6–3

Doubles

 Sanchai Ratiwatana /  Sonchat Ratiwatana def.  Ruan Roelofse /  Kittipong Wachiramanowong, 4–6, 7–6(7–1), [13–11]

External links
Official Website

ATP China International Tennis Challenge
Kunming Open
2012 in Chinese tennis